The 4th Assam Legislative Assembly election was held in two phases in 1967 to elect members from 126 constituencies in Assam, India.

Constituencies

Assam Legislative Assembly, 126 consisted of 93 Genrael constituencies, 24 Scheduled Tribes and 9 Scheduled Castes constituencies. A total of 492 nominations were filed out of which 486 were men's and 6 were women withdrew their nominations. 4 women were elected to Assam Legislative Assembly.

Political Parties

9 National parties along with 10 registered unrecognized parties took part in the assembly election. Indian National Congress contested 92 seats and won 76 of them. Independent candidates won 14 seats while no other party cross double-digit.

Results

|- style="background-color:#E9E9E9; text-align:center;"
! class="unsortable" |
! Political Party !! Flag !! Seats  Contested !! Won !! % of  Seats !! Votes !! Vote %
|- style="background: #90EE90;"
| 
| style="text-align:left;" |Indian National Congress
| 
| 120 || 73 || 44.66% || 1354748 || 43.60%
|-
| 
| style="text-align:left;" |All Party Hill Leaders Conference
|
| 12 || 9 || 57.86% || 108447 || 3.49%
|-
| 
| style="text-align:left;" |Communist Party of India
| 
| 22 || 7 || 30.19% || 108447 || 5.15%
|-
| 
| style="text-align:left;" |Praja Socialist Party
| 
| 35 || 5 || 23.20% || 213094 || 6.86%
|-
| 
| style="text-align:left;" |Samyukta Socialist Party
| 
| 17 || 4 || 26.37% || 101802 || 3.28%
|-
| 
| style="text-align:left;" |Swatantra Party
| 
| 13 || 3 || 14.07% || 46187 || 1.49%
|-
| 
|
| 124 || 26 || 36.12% || 1004695 || 32.33%
|- class="unsortable" style="background-color:#E9E9E9"
! colspan = 3| Total Seats
! 105 !! style="text-align:center;" |Voters !! 5449305 !! style="text-align:center;" |Turnout !! 3369230 (61.83%)
|}

Constituency-wise results

See also
1967 elections in India

References

Assam
State Assembly elections in Assam
1960s in Assam
March 1967 events in Asia